The Bagan is a river in Novosibirsk Oblast, Russia.

The basin of the river is located in the Kargatsky, Bagansky, Zdvinsky, Dovolensky, Krasnozyorsky and Karasuksky districts. Since 1994 here is a  Ramsar site in the lower course of the river.

Course 
The Bagan river system is an endorheic basin between the Ob and the Irtysh rivers. The sources are in a swamp at the western edge of the Ob Plateau. The river flows in a roughly WSW direction all along its course. It is fed mainly by snow. As it progresses along the Kulunda Plain it flows across many lakes of different sizes. Finally it ends up in Lake Ivanovskoye. In the river basin there are numerous swamps and lakes, both freshwater and brackish. The Bagan tends to dry up seasonally in its lower reaches.

There are a number of villages near the banks of the Bagan, such as Ozerki 6th, Inder, Dovolnoye, Volchanka, Druzhny, Novogornostalevo, Barlakul, Kukarka, Pokrovka, Paletskoye, Bagan and Ivanovka.

Tributaries 

See also
List of rivers of Russia

References

External links
Distribution of Alien Fish Species in Lakes within the Temperate Climatic Zone of Western Siberia
Implementation of the national project "Ecology" on the lakes of the Novosibirsk region
Indicators of desertification in the Kulunda Steppe in the south of Western Siberia

Rivers of Novosibirsk Oblast
West Siberian Plain
Endorheic basins of Asia